The Abnaki-class tug is a class of United States Navy fleet ocean tugs which began construction in November 1942. Comprising 22 oceangoing tugboats, the class was constructed in response to the needs of World War II, but members of the class served in the Korean War and Vietnam War as well. The United States Navy no longer has any ships of this class in active duty.

Ships

See also

 Sotoyomo-class fleet tug
 Type V ship - Tugs
 List of auxiliaries of the United States Navy

References

 

  
Auxiliary tugboat classes